Samuel (S.) Lewis Johnson, Jr. (September 13, 1915 – January 28, 2004), was a conservative evangelical pastor and theologian, was for many years a professor at Dallas Theological Seminary. Johnson was a moderate dispensationalist and a Five-point Calvinist in his soteriology. He was a Biblical scholar and theologian of "rare abilities" and of international renown.

Life
Johnson was born in Birmingham, Alabama and grew up in Charleston, SC, graduating from College of Charleston with an A. B. degree in 1937. Afterwards he moved back to Birmingham, entered his father's insurance business and married Mary Sibley McCormack. He was converted in Birmingham, while in the insurance business, through the teaching of Dr. Donald Grey Barnhouse. He left the insurance business in 1943 to enter Dallas Theological Seminary, from which he received a Th.M. (1946) and a Th.D. (1949).

Upon graduation he became a professor at Dallas Theological Seminary, where he taught Greek, Hebrew, and systematic theology for 21 years (1950 to 1972). After retiring from Dallas Seminary, he became Professor of Biblical and Systematic Theology at Trinity Evangelical Divinity School in Deerfield, Illinois from 1980 to 1985, as well as serving as a visiting Professor of New Testament at Grace Theological Seminary, Winona Lake, Indiana. From 1985 to 1993 he served as a visiting Professor of Systematic Theology at Tyndale Theological Seminary in Badhoevedorp, Amsterdam, Netherlands.

During his years of ministry he was a guest speaker at Bible conferences in Canada, Mexico, Guatemala, Australia, Jamaica, and Europe. Publications include, The Old Testament in the New, (1980), as well as numerous periodical articles, especially in Bibliotheca Sacra (published by Dallas Seminary). He was on the translation committees for The Berkeley Bible and The New International Version and contributor to Recovering Biblical Manhood and Womanhood (Crossway Books, 1991).

He was also engaged in pastoral ministry for over forty years. He served as pastor of Independent Presbyterian Church (1951–1954), which later became Northwest Bible Church, pastor of Grace Bible Church (1954–1958), and as an elder and minister at Believers Chapel (1963–1993) all in Dallas. Lewis Johnson died on January 28, 2004.

Works

Books

 - date uncertain

 - of unknown date

Articles and chapters

Festschrift

References

External links
Online teaching, mp3 files from Believers Chapel in Dallas.
SLJ Institute featuring the teaching of S. Lewis Johnson, Jr.
Tribute to S. Lewis Johnson by Fred G. Zaspel

1915 births
2004 deaths
American theologians
Bible translators
American biblical scholars
New Testament scholars
Trinity International University faculty
20th-century translators